Patience Okabande (born 18 May 1995) is a Congolese handball player for Blanzat Sport Montluçon Handball and the Congolese national team.

She represented Congo at the 2021 World Women's Handball Championship in Spain.

References

1995 births
Living people
Congolese female handball players